Human rights in Canada have come under increasing public attention and legal protection since World War II. Prior to that time, there were few legal protections for human rights. The protections which did exist focused on specific issues, rather than taking a general approach to human rights.

The current legal framework for the protection of human rights in Canada consists of constitutional entitlements, and statutory human rights codes, both federal and provincial. The constitutional foundation of the modern Canadian human rights system is the Canadian Charter of Rights and Freedoms of 1982, which is part of the Constitution of Canada. Before 1982, there was little direct constitutional protection against government interference with human rights, although provincial and federal laws did provide some protection for human rights enforceable against government and private parties. Today, the Charter guarantees fundamental freedoms (free expression, religion, association and peaceful assembly), democratic rights (such as participation in elections), mobility rights, legal rights, equality rights, and language rights.

Controversial human rights issues in Canada have included assisted suicide rights, patient rights, freedom of expression, freedom of religion, parents' rights, children's rights, abortion rights vs fetal rights, minority rights, majority rights, rights of the disabled, aboriginal rights, tenant rights and economic, social and political rights.

History

Colonial period 

The first legal protection for human rights in Canada related to religious freedom.  The Articles of Capitulation of the town of Quebec, negotiated between the French and British military commanders after the fall of Quebec in 1759, provided a guarantee of "the free exercise of the Roman religion" until the possession of Canada was determined by the British and French governments.  A similar guarantee was included in the Articles of Capitulation of Montreal the next year.  The two guarantees were formally confirmed by Britain in the Treaty of Paris, 1763, and then given statutory protection in the Quebec Act, 1774.  The result was that the British subjects in Quebec had greater guarantees of religious liberty at that time than did the Roman Catholic inhabitants of Great Britain and Ireland, who would not receive similar guarantees until Catholic emancipation in 1829.

Nearly a century later, the Province of Canada passed similar legislation, ending the establishment of the Church of England in the province, and recognizing instead the principle of "legal equality among all religious denominations".  The Act provided that the "free exercise and enjoyment of religious profession and worship" was protected by the Constitution and laws of the Province.

Confederation and onwards

Constitutional framework 

In 1867, Canada was created by the British North America Act, 1867 (now named the Constitution Act, 1867).  In keeping with British constitutional traditions, the Act did not include an entrenched list of rights, other than specific rights relating to language use in legislatures and courts, and provisions protecting the right of certain religious minorities to establish their own separate and denominational schools.  Canadian law instead followed the British constitutional approach in which the (unenumerated) "Rights of Englishmen" had traditionally been defended by all the branches of the government (Parliament, the courts, and the Crown) collectively and sometimes in competition with each other.  However, 20th century political and legal thought also emphasized the importance of freedom of contract and property rights as important aspects of liberty and the rule of law.  This approach meant that what are now viewed as human rights concerns, based on personal circumstances, would be considered of lesser importance than contractual and property rights.

Human rights issues in the first seventy years of Canadian history thus tended to be raised in the framework of the constitutional division of powers between the federal and provincial governments.  A person who was affected by a provincial law could challenge that law in the courts, arguing that it intruded on a matter reserved for the federal government.  Alternatively, a person who was affected by federal law could challenge it in court, arguing that it intruded on a matter reserved for the provinces.  In either case, the focus was primarily on the constitutional authority of the federal and provincial governments, not on the rights of the individual.

The division of powers is also the reason that the term "civil rights" is not used in Canada in the same way as it is used in other countries, such as the United States.  One of the main areas of provincial jurisdiction is "Property and civil rights", which is a broad phrase used to encompass all of what is normally termed the civil law, such as contracts, property, torts/delicts, family law, wills, estates and successions and so on.  This use of the phrase dates back to the Quebec Act, 1774.  Given the broad, established meaning of "civil rights" in Canadian constitutional law, it has not been used in the more specific meaning of personal equality rights.  Instead, the terms "human rights" / "droits de la personne" are used.

Early cases

Union Colliery Co. v. Bryden (1899) 

In Union Colliery Co of British Columbia v Bryden a shareholder of Union Colliery Co. accused the company of violating the Coal Mines Regulation Act.  That law had been passed by the provincial Legislature of British Columbia and prohibited the hiring of people of Chinese origin, using an ethnic slur in the legislation. The company successfully challenged the constitutionality of the Act on the grounds that it dealt with a matter of exclusive federal jurisdiction, namely "Naturalization and Aliens".  In reaching this conclusion, the Judicial Committee of the Privy Council, at that time the highest court for the British Empire, found that evidence which had been led at trial about the reliability and compentence of the Chinese employees of the colliery was irrelevant to the constitutional issue.  The personal circumstances and ability of those employees did not relate to the issue of federal and provincial jurisdiction.

Cunningham v Homma (1902) 

The decision in Union Colliery did not establish any general principle of equality based on race or ethnicity.  In each case, the issue of race or ethnicity was simply one fact the courts took into account in determining if a matter was within federal or provincial jurisdiction.  For example, just three years later, in the case of Cunningham v Homma, a provincial law prohibiting people of Chinese, Japanese or Indian descent from voting in provincial elections was held to be constitutional.  The Judicial Committee rejected a challenge to the provincial law brought by a naturalized Japanese-Canadian, Tomekichi Homma, who had been denied the right to vote in British Columbia provincial elections.  The Judicial Committee held that control of the franchise in provincial elections came within the province's exclusive jurisdiction to legislate with respect to the constitution of the province.  Again, the personal circumstances of the individual, in this case whether naturalised or native-born, were not relevant to the issue of the constitutional authority of the province.  There was no inherent right to vote.

Quong Wing v R (1914) 

Similarly, in the case of Quong Wing v R, the Supreme Court upheld a Saskatchewan law which prohibited businesses owned by anyone of Japanese, Chinese or other East Asian background from hiring any "white woman or girl" to work in the business.  The Court, by a 4–1 majority, found that the province had jurisdiction over businesses and employment, or alternatively that the law in question was in relation to local public morality, another area of provincial jurisdiction.  The judges in the majority acknowledged that the law had an effect on some Canadians based on their race or ethnic origins, but that was not sufficient to take the case outside of provincial jurisdiction.  The dissenting judge, Justice Idington, was the only one who would have struck down the statute, but as in the other cases, he based his conclusion on the division of powers, not on the rights of the individual.  He would have held that the provincial Act limited the statutory rights granted by the federal Naturalization Act, and was therefore beyond provincial jurisdiction.

Christie v York Corporation (1940) 

Canadian courts also upheld discrimination in public places based on freedom of contract and property rights.  For example, in Christie v York Corporation, the plaintiff, a black man, was denied service at a bar at the Montreal Forum.  He sued for damages, arguing that the tavern was under a duty to provide services to all members of the public.  The case reached the Supreme Court, which held by a 4-1 majority that the owner of the business had complete freedom of commerce and could refuse service to whomever it wished, on whatever grounds it wished.  The lone dissenter, Justice Davis, would have held that the Quebec statute regulating liquor sales to the public required restaurants to provide their service to all customers, without discrimination.

The King v Desmond (1946) 

Viola Desmond, a black Nova Scotian, went to see a movie in a theatre in New Glasgow, Nova Scotia. The owner of the theatre would only allow white people to sit on the main floor. Non-whites had to sit in the gallery. Desmond, who was from out of town, did not know of the policy.  She bought a ticket for the movie and went onto the main floor. When the theatre employees told her to go to the gallery, she refused.  The police were called and she was forcibly removed. Desmond spent a night in jail and was fined $20, on the basis that by sitting on the main floor when her ticket was for the gallery, she had deprived the provincial government of the additional tax for the main floor ticket:  one cent.  She sought to challenge her treatment, by an application for judicial review of the tax ruling.  The court dismissed the challenge on the basis that the tax statute was neutral with respect to race.  The judge suggested in his decision that the outcome might have been different if she had instead appealed the conviction, on the basis that the law was being used improperly by the theatre owner to enforce a "Jim Crow" type of segregation.

In 2018, the Bank of Canada announced that Viola Desmond would be the person shown on the new ten-dollar note.

Noble v Alley (1955) 

Noble v. Alley was a challenge to a restrictive covenant for the sale of land at a cottage resort. The owner of the land had bought it with a requirement from an earlier owner that the land not be sold to Jewish or non-white people. The owner wished to sell it to an individual who was Jewish.  The owner challenged the restrictive covenant, over the opposition of other residents in the cottage resort. The Supreme Court held that the covenant was not enforceable on the basis that it was too vague, and that restrictive covenants on land had to be related to land use, not the personal characteristics of the owner.

Implied Bill of Rights 

In 1938 there was a development in judicial protection of rights. The government of the province of Alberta had passed a series of laws to implement its social credit platform, and had come under heavy media criticism.  In response, the Legislature enacted the Accurate News and Information Act, which would give the government the power to direct media's coverage of the government.  The federal government referred several of the Alberta bills to the Supreme Court for a reference opinion.  Three of the six members of the Court found that public comment on the government, and freedom of the press, are so important to a democracy that there is an implied bill of rights in Canada's Constitution, to protect those values.  The Court suggested that only the federal Parliament could have the power to impinge on political rights protected by the implied bill of rights.  The Accurate News and Information Act was therefore unconstitutional.  The Supreme Court has not, however, used the "implied bill of rights" in very many subsequent cases.

Saskatchewan Bill of Rights (1947) 

The events leading up to World War II, and the genocidal practices of the Nazi government of Germany, had a major effect on the protection of human rights in Canada. Tommy Douglas, at that time a Member of Parliament from Saskatchewan, was in Europe in 1936 and witnessed the Nuremberg Rally of that year, which had a significant effect on him.  When he was elected Premier of Saskatchewan, one of his first goals was to entrench human rights in Canada's constitution.  At the 1945 Dominion-Provincial Conference he proposed adding a bill of rights to the British North America Act, 1867, but was not able to gain support for the proposal.  Instead, in 1947, the Government of Saskatchewan introduced the Saskatchewan Bill of Rights, the first bill of rights in the Commonwealth since the English Bill of Rights of 1689.

The Saskatchewan Bill of Rights provided significant protections for fundamental freedoms:

 right to freedom of conscience and religion (s. 3);
 right to free expression (s. 4);
 right to peaceable assembly and association (s. 5);
 right to freedom from arbitrary imprisonment and right to immediate judicial determination of a detention (s. 6);
 right to vote in provincial elections (s. 7).

Canadian Bill of Rights (1960) 

John Diefenbaker, also from Saskatchewan, was another early proponent of protecting human rights in Canada.  He wrote a first draft of a bill of rights as a young lawyer in the 1920s. Elected a Member of Parliament in 1940, he regularly introduced a motion each year from 1946 onwards, calling for Parliament to enact a bill of rights at the federal level.  He was concerned that there be a guarantee of equality for all Canadians, not just those who had English or French heritage.  He also wanted protection for basic freedoms, such as freedom of expression.

In 1960, by then the Prime Minister of Canada, Diefenbaker introduced the Canadian Bill of Rights.  This federal statute provide guarantees, binding on the federal government, to protect freedom of speech, freedom of religion, equality rights, the right to life, liberty and security of the person, and property rights.  It also sets out significant protections for individuals charged with criminal offences.

The Canadian Bill of Rights suffered from two drawbacks.  First, as a statute of the federal Parliament, it was only binding on the federal government.  The federal parliament does not have the constitutional authority to enact laws which bind the provincial governments in relation to human rights.  Second, and following from the statutory nature of the Bill, the courts were reluctant to use the provisions of the Bill as the basis for judicial review of federal statutes.  Under the doctrine of parliamentary supremacy, the courts were concerned that one Parliament cannot bind future Parliaments.

In two significant cases, the Supreme Court rejected attempts to use the Bill of Rights to review legislation. In Bliss v. Canada, the Court rejected a gender-based challenge to unemployment benefits which did not apply to pregnant women, while in Attorney General of Canada v. Lavell, the Court rejected a challenge based on gender and indigenous status to provisions of the Indian Act. A notable exception was R. v. Drybones, which did use the Bill of Rights to overturn a different provision of the Indian Act.

Human Rights Acts 

The other provinces began to follow Saskatchewan's lead and enacted human rights laws: Ontario (1962), Nova Scotia (1963), Alberta (1966), New Brunswick (1967), Prince Edward Island (1968), Newfoundland (1969), British Columbia (1969), Manitoba (1970)  and Quebec (1975). In 1977, the federal government enacted the Canadian Human Rights Act.

Significant historical cases 

In addition to these particular court cases, there were also general cases which arose in Canada, prior to the enactment of human rights legislation.

Komagata Maru incident

The Komagata Maru incident occurred 1914 when a group of Indians, all British subjects, arrived in Vancouver with the intention of settling in Canada. They were denied entry because of their race. One of the Sikh passengers, Jagat Singh Thind, was the youngest brother of Bhagat Singh Thind, an Indian-American Sikh writer and lecturer on "spiritual science" who was involved in an important legal battle over the rights of Indians to obtain U.S. citizenship (United States v. Bhagat Singh Thind).

World War I treatment of Ukrainian Canadians

The Ukrainian Canadian internment was part of the confinement of "enemy aliens" in Canada during and for two years after the end of the First World War, lasting from 1914 to 1920, under the terms of the War Measures Act. About 4,000 Ukrainian men and some women and children of Austro-Hungarian citizenship were kept in twenty-four internment camps and related work sites – also known, at the time, as concentration camps. Many were released in 1916 to help with the mounting labour shortage.

Chinese head tax and Chinese Immigration Act of 1923 
 
The Chinese head tax was a fixed fee charged to each Chinese person entering Canada. The head tax was first levied after the Canadian parliament passed the Chinese Immigration Act of 1885 and was meant to discourage Chinese people from entering Canada after the completion of the Canadian Pacific Railway. The tax was abolished by the Chinese Immigration Act of 1923, which stopped Chinese immigration altogether, except for business people, clergy, educators, students, and other categories.

World War II treatment of Japanese Canadians

Japanese Canadian internment refers to confinement of Japanese Canadians in British Columbia during World War II. The internment began in December 1941, after the attack by carrier-borne forces of Imperial Japan on American naval and army facilities at Pearl Harbor. The Canadian federal government gave the internment order based on speculation of sabotage and espionage, although the RCMP and defence department lacked proof. Many interned children were brought up in these camps, including David Suzuki, Joy Kogawa, and Roy Miki. The Canadian government promised the Japanese Canadians that their property and finances would be returned upon release; however, these assets were sold off cheaply at auctions.

Cold War forced relocation

In the early 1950s and in the context of the Cold War, the federal government forcibly relocated 87 Inuit citizens to the High Arctic as human symbols of Canada's assertion of ownership of the region. The Inuit were told that they would be returned home to Northern Quebec after a year if they wished, but this offer was later withdrawn as it would damage Canada's claims to the High Arctic; they were forced to stay. In 1993, after extensive hearings, the Royal Commission on Aboriginal Peoples issued The High Arctic Relocation: A Report on the 1953–55 Relocation.  The government paid compensation and in 2010 issued a formal apology.

Residential schools

The Indian residential schools of Canada were a network of "residential" (boarding) schools for Aboriginal peoples of Canada (First Nations, Métis, and Inuit) funded by the Canadian government's Department of Indian Affairs, and administered by Christian churches, most notably the Catholic Church in Canada and the Anglican Church of Canada.  The system had origins in pre-Confederation times, but was primarily active following the passage of the Indian Act in 1876, until the mid-twentieth century.  The last residential school was not closed until 1997.

Contemporary human rights issues

Modern international view of indigenous rights
On April 29, 2022, the United Nations Human Rights Committee sent a letter that criticized Canada over its ill-treatment of Indigenous people who opposed the construction of two pipelines in British Columbia. The letter called on Canada to "immediately cease forced evictions" of indigenous protesters by police and halt construction on the two pipelines until it obtains consent from the affected indigenous communities. The letter alleges that authorities intimidated and pushed indigenous people off their lands by using surveillance and force.

Current legal framework

Domestic legal protection framework 

Human rights in Canada are now given legal protections by the dual mechanisms of constitutional entitlements and statutory human rights codes, both federal and provincial

The Canadian Charter of Rights and Freedoms is part of the Constitution of Canada. The Charter guarantees political, mobility, and equality rights and fundamental freedoms such as freedom of expression, freedom of assembly and freedom of religion. It only applies to governments, and not to private individuals, businesses or other organizations. Charter rights are enforced by legal actions in the criminal and civil courts, depending on the context in which a Charter claim arises.

There are two main pieces of human rights legislation which apply at the federal level:  the Charter and the statutory Canadian Human Rights Act. The Canadian Human Rights Act protects people in Canada from discrimination when they are employed by or receive services from the federal government, or private companies that are regulated by the federal government. The Act applies throughout Canada, but only to federally regulated enterprises.  Approximately 15% of workplaces are covered by the Canadian Human Rights Act.

At the provincial level, human rights are protected by the Charter and by provincial human rights legislation.  The Charter applies to provincial governments and agencies, and also local governments created by provincial law, such as municipalities and school boards. Provincial human rights laws also apply to governments, and also to workplaces under provincial jurisdiction. It is estimated that 85% of workplaces are covered by provincial human rights laws.

Although there is variation among the matters covered by federal, provincial and territorial, they all generally provide anti-discrimination protections concerning employment practices, housing, and the provision of goods and services generally available to the public. The laws prohibit discrimination on enumerated personal characteristics, such as race, sex, religion or sexual orientation.

Claims under the human rights laws are of a civil nature. They are typically investigated by a human rights commission under the applicable human rights law and are adjudicated either by a human rights tribunal or by the court of first instance.  The tribunal or court generally has broad remedial powers.

Effect of international treaties 
Canada is a founding member of the UN, and in addition to the Universal Declaration of Human Rights, Canada has ratified seven principal UN human rights conventions and covenants:

 International Convention on the Elimination of All Forms of Racial Discrimination (accession by Canada in 1970)
 International Covenant on Civil and Political Rights (accession by Canada in 1976)
 International Covenant on Economic, Social and Cultural Rights (ratified by Canada in 1976)
 Convention on the Elimination of All Forms of Discrimination against Women (ratified by Canada in 1981)
 Convention against Torture and Other Cruel, Inhuman or Degrading Treatment or Punishment (ratified by Canada in 1987)
 Convention on the Rights of the Child (ratified by Canada in 1991)
 Convention on the Rights of Persons with Disabilities (ratified by Canada in 2010)

The Supreme Court of Canada has noted the important role played by international human rights law in the country and the influence that treaties can have on the interpretation of domestic legislation and the Charter. International customary laws are generally considered to be automatically part of Canadian law so long as they do not conflict with existing Canadian legislation, as established in R v Hape (2007). Canada follows a dualist approach with respect to the domestic effect of international treaties. The dualist system means that in order for the treaty obligations to be given the force of law domestically, the treaty must be incorporated into domestic legislation. In Canada, international human rights treaties are, in general, not directly incorporated into domestic law but, rather, are implemented through a variety of laws, policies and programs at the federal, provincial and territorial level.

Equality

Race 
Section 15 of the Canadian Charter of Rights and Freedoms guarantees that “Every individual is equal before and under the law and has the right to the equal protection and equal benefit of the law without discrimination and, in particular, without discrimination based on race.”

Canada has enacted comprehensive legislation prohibiting discrimination on the basis of race, colour, and national or ethnic origin in the federally regulated provision of goods and services, and employment practices in the Canadian Human Rights Act.  Furthermore, all Canadian provinces and territories have legislation prohibiting discrimination on the basis of race, colour, and national or ethnic origin in employment practices, housing, the provision of goods and services, and in accommodation or facilities customarily available to the public. Beginning in the 1970s, Canada launched a series of affirmative action programs aimed at increasing representation of racial minorities. Today, the Employment Equity Act, requires private and public sector employers under federal jurisdiction to increase representation of visible minorities and indigenous persons.

Throughout Canadian history, there has been a pattern of systemic racial discrimination, particularly towards indigenous persons, but to other groups as well, including African, Chinese, Japanese, South Asian, Jewish, and Muslim Canadians. These patterns of discrimination persist today. The UN Human Rights Council's Working Group of Experts on People of African Descent issued a report in 2017 finding "clear evidence that racial profiling is endemic in the strategies and practices used by law enforcement" in Canada. In 2018 Statistics Canada reported that members of immigrant and visible minority populations, compared with their Canadian-born and non-visible minority counterparts, were significantly more likely to report experiencing some form of discrimination on the basis of their ethnicity or culture, and race or skin colour.

Gender 

Within the Canadian Context, human rights protections for women consist of constitutional entitlements and federal and provincial statutory protections. Section 28 of the Canadian Charter of Rights and Freedoms guarantees that all “the rights and freedoms referred to in it are guaranteed equally to male and female persons.” Section 28 is not a right in of itself, as it does not state that men and women are equal; this is done by Section 15. Instead, Section 28 ensures that men and women have equal claim to rights listed in the charter.

Canada has enacted comprehensive legislation prohibiting discrimination on the basis of sex in the federally regulated provision of goods and services, and employment practices in the Canadian Human Rights Act. Furthermore, all Canadian provinces and territories have legislation prohibiting discrimination on the basis of sex in employment practices, housing, the provision of goods and services, and in accommodation or facilities customarily available to the public. Beginning in the 1960s, Canada launched a series of affirmative action programs aimed at increasing representation of women. Today, the Employment Equity Act, requires private and public sector employers under federal jurisdiction to increase representation of women; one of the four designated groups protected by the act.

According to the Global Gender Gap Index, an annual report published by the World Economic Forum, which rates the gender gap between women and men in health, education, economy and politics to gauge the state of gender equality in a country, Canada ranked 16 out of 149 countries in 2018. A 2015 UN Human Rights report raised concerns about “the persisting inequalities between women and men” in Canada, including the “high level of the pay gap” and its disproportionate effect on low-income women, racialized women, and Indigenous women. A 2017 study by Statistics Canada found that Canadian women earn $0.87 for every dollar earned by men, largely as a result of wage inequality between women and men within occupations.

Disability 

The rights of disabled persons in Canada are protected under the Canadian Charter of Rights and Freedoms in Section 15, which explicitly prohibits discrimination on the basis of mental or physical disability. Canada ratified the UN Convention on the Rights of Persons with Disabilities in 2010.

Canada has adopted comprehensive anti-discrimination and accommodation legislation for people with disabilities. The Canadian Human Rights Act prohibits discrimination of disabled persons in the federally regulated provision of goods and services and employment practices. Furthermore, all Canadian provinces and territories have legislation prohibiting discrimination on the basis of disability in employment practices, housing, the provision of goods and services, and in accommodation or facilities customarily available to the public.

Several programs and services are also subject to specific legislation requiring inclusive approaches. For example, Canada Elections Act requires that polling stations be accessible (e.g., providing material in multiple formats, open and closed caption videotapes for voters who are hearing impaired, a voting template for people with visual disabilities, and many other services). Notable ad hoc legislation with disability provisions include section 6 of the Canada Evidence Act, which regulates evidence-gathering involving persons with mental and physical disabilities, and the Employment Equity Act, which requires private and public sector employers under federal jurisdiction to increase representation of persons with disabilities.

Federal benefits include the Canada disability savings bond, and the Canada disability savings grant which are deposited into the Registered Disability Savings Plan (RDSP) of low-income families, as established by the Disability Savings Act. Disabled persons may also be eligible for the Disability Tax Credit, and the families of children with disabilities are eligible for the Canada Child Disability Benefit, a tax-free monthly payment. There are also several provincial and territorial programs focused on income, housing, and employment supports for persons living with disabilities.

LGBT 

The Supreme Court of Canada established in Egan v. Canada (1995), that sexual orientation was “a deeply personal characteristic that is either unchangeable or changeable only at unacceptable personal costs,” and therefore was one of the analogous grounds to the explicitly mentioned groups in Section 15 of the Canadian Charter of Rights and Freedoms. As the explicitly named grounds do not exhaust the scope of Section 15, this reasoning has been extended to protect gender identity and status as a transgender person in CF v. Alberta (2014); however, it has not been formally recognized as an analogous ground.

Canada has enacted comprehensive legislation prohibiting discrimination on the basis of sexual orientation and gender identity or expression. In 1996, the Canadian Human Rights Act was amended to include sexual orientation as a protected ground, and gender identity or expression were incorporated as additional protected grounds through An Act to amend the Canadian Human Rights Act and the Criminal Code in 2017. As of 2018, all Canadian provinces and territories have legislation prohibiting discrimination on the basis of sexual orientation and gender identity or expression in employment practices, housing, the provision of goods and services, and in accommodation or facilities customarily available to the public.

The Canadian federal government created the LGBTQ2 Secretariat in 2016 to support the integration of LGBTQ2 considerations into the everyday work of the Government of Canada. On November 28, 2017, Prime Minister Justin Trudeau delivered a formal apology in the House of Commons to individuals harmed by federal legislation, policies and practices that led to the discrimination of LGBTQ2 people in Canada, and introduced Bill C-66, the Expungement of Historically Unjust Convictions Act, which received royal assent in June 2018. The legislation was created to destroy records of consensual sexual activity between same-sex partners of legal age.

Language and culture 

The perceived failure of Canada to establish the equality of the French and English languages was one of the main reasons for the rise of the Quebec secessionist movement, during the Quiet Revolution. Consequently, the federal government began officially adopting multicultural and bilingual policies in the 1970s and 1980s.

The Constitution Act of 1982 established French and English as Canada's two official languages. Guarantees for the equal status of the two official languages are provided in Sections 16–23 of the Canadian Charter of Rights and Freedoms. Section 16 guarantees that French and English “have equality of status and equal rights and privileges.” These sections of the Charter provide a constitutional guarantee for the equal status of both languages in Parliament, in all federal government institutions, and federal courts.

Multiculturalism is reflected in Canadian law through the Canadian Multiculturalism Act of 1988 and Section 27 of the Canadian Charter of Rights and Freedoms, which states that “This Charter shall be interpreted in a manner consistent with the preservation and enhancement of the multicultural heritage of Canadians.” The Canadian Multiculturalism Act affirms that the Canadian government recognizes the multicultural heritage of Canada, the rights of indigenous persons, minority cultural rights, and the right to social equality within society and under the law regardless of race, colour, ancestry, national or ethnic origin, creed or religion.

Bill 101 in Quebec 
Bill 101 in Quebec is the common name for a statute passed by the National Assembly of Quebec in 1977, the Charter of the French Language.  The law was enacted to propagate the French language and restrict the use of English. For example, the current law specifies that commercial outdoor signs can be multilingual so long as French is markedly predominant. In 1993, the United Nations Human Rights Committee ruled that Quebec's sign laws broke an international covenant on civil and political rights. "A State may choose one or more official languages," the committee wrote, "but it may not exclude, outside the spheres of public life, the freedom to express oneself in a language of one's choice."

Fundamental Freedoms 
Section 2 of the Canadian Charter of Rights and Freedoms guarantees four "fundamental freedoms."

Freedom of conscience and religion 

Freedom of conscience and religion is protected by Section 2(a) of the Canadian Charter of Rights and Freedoms. Religious freedom is further protected by Section 15 of the Charter, which promotes the pursuance of equality and the freedom from discrimination under enumerated or analogous grounds; one of which is religion.

In a 1985 Supreme Court case, R. v. Big M Drug Mart Ltd., Chief Justice Brian Dickson said that religious freedom in Canada includes freedom of religious speech, including "the right to entertain such religious beliefs as a person chooses, the right to declare religious beliefs openly and without fear of hindrance or reprisal, and the right to manifest religious belief by worship and practice or by teaching and dissemination."

Concerns with regards to religious freedom remain, in respect to, discriminatory public funding of religious education in some provinces, public interest limitations of religious freedom, state religious neutrality and religious dress, and conflicts between anti-discrimination law and religiously motivated discrimination.

Three provinces, Alberta, Ontario, and Saskatchewan, are constitutionally required to operate separate and publicly funded schools. On November 5, 1999, the UN Human Rights Committee condemned Canada and Ontario for having violated the equality provisions of the International Covenant on Civil and Political Rights. The Committee restated its concerns on November 2, 2005, observing that Canada had failed to "adopt steps in order to eliminate discrimination on the basis of religion in the funding of schools in Ontario."

Freedom of expression 

Freedom of expression is protected by Section 2(b) of the Canadian Charter of Rights and Freedoms, which guarantees “Freedom of thought, belief, opinion and expression, including freedom of the press and other media of communication.” Freedom of speech and expression has constitutional protection in Canada but is not absolute. Section 1 of the Charter allows limitations on this freedom if it can be “justified in a free and democratic society.” The Charter protection works to ensure that all such limits are reasonable and strictly necessary. The approach by the Supreme Court on free expression has been that in deciding whether a restriction on freedom of expression is justified, the harms done by the particular form of expression must be weighed against the harm that would be done by the restriction itself.

In Canada, legal limitations on freedom of expression include:

 Sedition, fraud, specific threats of violence, and disclosure of classified information 
 Civil offences involving libel, defamation, fraud, or workplace harassment 
 Violations of copyright laws
 Criminal offences involving hate speech and genocide advocacy 
 Municipal by-laws that regulate signage or where protests may take place

Some limitations remain controversial due to concerns that they infringe on freedom of expression.

Freedom of peaceful assembly 
Freedom of peaceful assembly is protected by Section 2(c) of the Canadian Charter of Rights and Freedoms guarantees to all Canadians freedom of peaceful assembly. In 1987, the Supreme Court found in Reference Re Public Service Employee Relations Act (Alta), that despite being written as a separate right, Section 2(c) was closely related to freedom of expression.

Recent controversies involving concerns about freedom of assembly in Canada include the eviction of Occupy Canada's protests from public parks in 2011, the possible effects of Bill C-51 on freedom of assembly, and ongoing CSIS surveillance of environmental and indigenous activists.

Freedom of association 
Freedom of association is protected by Section 2(d) of the Canadian Charter of Rights and Freedoms. This section provides Canadians the right to establish, belong to and maintain to any sort of organization unless that organization is otherwise illegal. This right only protects the right of individuals to form associations and not the activities of the associations themselves.

Generally, this charter right is used in the labour context where employees are given the right to associate with certain unions or other similar groups to represent their interests in labour disputes or negotiations. The Supreme Court also found in R. v. Advance Cutting & Coring Ltd. (2001), that the right to freedom of association also includes, at least to some degree, the freedom not to associate, but still upheld a law requiring all persons working in the province's construction industry to join a designated union.

Assessments

Comparisons of provincial and territorial legislation 
In January 2018, the Canadian Centre for Diversity and Inclusion released a report comparing provincial legislation regarding human rights. Every province includes slightly different "prohibited grounds" for discrimination, covers different areas of society (e.g. employment, tenancy, etc.), and applies the law slightly differently. For example, in Nunavut, the Nunavut Human Rights Act directs the Nunavut Human Rights Tribunal to interpret the law so as not to conflict with the Nunavut Land Claims Agreement and to respect the principles of Inuit Qaujimajatuqangit, described as "Inuit beliefs, laws, principles and values along with traditional knowledge, skills and attitudes." Nunavut is unique in Canada tying its humans rights code to an indigenous rather than a European-derived philosophical foundation.

International assessments 
According to Freedom in the World, an annual report by US-based think-tank Freedom House, which rates political rights and civil liberties, in 2019 Canada was ranked "Free" (the highest possible rating), together with 86 other countries, and as the 4th freest out of 195 countries.

According to the Democracy Index, an annual index published by the U.K.-based Economist Intelligence Unit, that measures pluralism, civil liberties, and the state of democracy, in 2018 Canada was ranked 6th out of 167 countries and received a score of 9.15 out of 10.00.

According to the annual Worldwide Press Freedom Index published by Reporters Without Borders, Canada ranked 18th out of 180 countries in 2018, and has a declining score due to police surveillance of journalists, recent court rulings compelling journalists to hand over communications with their sources, and criminal and civil charges against some journalists for coverage of protests.

According to the annual Corruption Perceptions Index, which was published by Transparency International, Canada was ranked 9th out of 180 countries from the top least corrupt.

See also 

List of endangered languages in Canada
 Women's rights in Canada
 LGBT rights in Canada
 Section Fifteen of the Canadian Charter of Rights and Freedoms
 History of free speech in Canada
 Freedom of religion in Canada
 Multiculturalism in Canada
 Project MKUltra and the Montreal experiments

Further reading 

Among the leading works on human rights in Canada, which have added great complexity to the issue by exploring twentieth-century paradigms, are Christopher MacLennan, Toward the Charter: Canadians and the Demand for a National Bill of Rights (Montreal/Kingston: McGill-Queen's University Press, 2003); Ross Lambertson, Repression and Resistance: Canadian Human Rights Activists, 1930–1960 (Toronto: University of Toronto Press, 2005); and Dominique Clément, Canada's Rights Revolution: Social Movements and Social Change, 1937–82 (Vancouver: University of British Columbia Press, 2008).

On the quest for anti-discrimination legislation in Ontario, see Ruth Frager and Carmela Patrias, This Is Our Country, These Are Our Rights': Minorities and the Origins of Ontario's Human Rights Campaign," Canadian Historical Review, vol. 82, no. 1 (March 2001), 1–35.

On the situation in Montreal and Toronto, including the Catholic aspect and Cold War discourse, see Patrick Lacroix, "Immigration, Minority Rights, and Catholic Policy-Making in Post-War Canada", Histoire sociale/Social History, vol. 47, no. 93 (May 2014), 183–203. The situation in Quebec may best be explored through the events of the Quiet Revolution.

For yet further information, see Dominique Clément and Canada's Human Rights History.

References 

 
History of human rights in Canada